Mother Courage and Her Children is a play written in 1939 by the German dramatist and poet Bertolt Brecht (1898–1956), with significant contributions from Margarete Steffin. Four theatrical productions were produced in Switzerland and Germany from 1941 to 1952, the last three supervised and/or directed by Brecht, who had returned to East Germany from the United States.

Several years after Brecht's death in 1956, the play was adapted as a German film, Mutter Courage und ihre Kinder (1961), starring Helene Weigel, Brecht's widow and a leading actress.

Mother Courage is considered by some to be the greatest play of the 20th century, and perhaps also the greatest anti-war play of all time. Critic Brett D. Johnson points out, "Although numerous theatrical artists and scholars may share artistic director Oskar Eustis's opinion that Brecht's masterpiece is the greatest play of the twentieth century, productions of Mother Courage remain a rarity in contemporary American theatre."

Synopsis
The play is set in the 17th century in Europe during the Thirty Years' War. The Recruiting Officer and Sergeant are introduced, both complaining about the difficulty of recruiting soldiers to the war. Anna Fierling (Mother Courage) enters pulling a cart containing provisions for sale to soldiers, and introduces her children Eilif, Kattrin, and Schweizerkas ("Swiss Cheese"). The sergeant negotiates a deal with Mother Courage while Eilif is conscripted by the Recruiting Officer.

Two years thereafter, Mother Courage argues with a Protestant General's cook over a capon, and Eilif is congratulated by the General for killing peasants and slaughtering their cattle. Eilif and his mother sing "The Fishwife and the Soldier". Mother Courage scolds her son for endangering himself.

Three years later, Swiss Cheese works as an army paymaster. The camp prostitute, Yvette Pottier, sings "The Fraternization Song". Mother Courage uses this song to warn Kattrin against involving herself with soldiers. Before the Catholic troops arrive, the Cook and Chaplain bring a message from Eilif. Swiss Cheese hides the regiment's paybox from invading soldiers, and Mother Courage and companions change their insignia from Protestant to Catholic. Swiss Cheese is captured and tortured by the Catholics, having hidden the paybox by the river. Mother Courage attempts bribery to free him, planning to pawn the wagon first and redeem it with the regiment money. When Swiss Cheese claims that he has thrown the box in the river, Mother Courage backtracks on the price, and Swiss Cheese is killed. Fearing to be shot as an accomplice, Mother Courage does not acknowledge his body, and it is discarded.

Later, Mother Courage waits outside the General's tent to register a complaint and sings the "Song of Great Capitulation" to a young soldier anxious to complain of inadequate pay. The song persuades both to withdraw their complaints.

When Catholic General Tilly's funeral approaches, the Chaplain tells Mother Courage that the war will still continue, and she is persuaded to pile up stocks. The Chaplain then suggests to Mother Courage that she marry him, but she rejects his proposal. Mother Courage curses the war because she finds Kattrin disfigured after being raped by a drunken soldier. Thereafter Mother Courage is again following the Protestant army.

While two peasants are trying to sell merchandise to her, they hear news of peace with the death of the Swedish king. The Cook appears and causes an argument between Mother Courage and the Chaplain. Mother Courage is off to the market while Eilif enters, dragged in by soldiers. Eilif is executed for killing a peasant while stealing livestock, trying to repeat the same act for which he was praised as hero in wartime, but Mother Courage never hears thereof. When she finds out the war continues, the Cook and Mother Courage move on with the wagon.

In the seventeenth year of the war, there is no food and no supplies. The Cook inherits an inn in Utrecht and suggests to Mother Courage that she operate it with him – but he refuses to harbour Kattrin because he fears that her disfigurement will repel potential customers. Thereafter Mother Courage and Kattrin pull the wagon by themselves.

When Mother Courage is trading in the Protestant city of Halle, Kattrin is left with a peasant family in the countryside overnight. As Catholic soldiers force the peasants to guide the army to the city for a sneak attack, Kattrin fetches a drum from the cart and beats it, waking the townspeople, but is herself shot. Early in the morning, Mother Courage sings a lullaby to her daughter's corpse, has the peasants bury it, and hitches herself to the cart.

Context
Mother Courage is one of nine plays that Brecht wrote in resistance to the rise of Fascism and Nazism. In response to the invasion of Poland by the German armies of Adolf Hitler in 1939, Brecht wrote Mother Courage in what writers call a "white heat"—in a little over a month. As the preface to the Ralph Manheim/John Willett Collected Plays puts it: 

Following Brecht's own principles for political drama, the play is not set in modern times but during the Thirty Years' War of 1618–1648, which involved all the European states. It follows the fortunes of Anna Fierling, nicknamed Mother Courage, a wily canteen woman with the Swedish Army, who is determined to make her living from the war. Over the course of the play, she loses all three of her children, Schweizerkas, Eilif, and Kattrin, to the very war from which she tried to profit.

Overview

The name of the central character, Mother Courage, is drawn from the picaresque writings of the 17th-century German writer Grimmelshausen. His central character in the early short novel, The Runagate Courage, also struggles and connives her way through the Thirty Years' War in Germany and Poland. Otherwise the story is mostly Brecht's, in collaboration with Steffin.

The action of the play takes place over the course of 12 years (1624 to 1636), represented in 12 scenes. Some give a sense of Courage's career, but do not provide time for viewers to develop sentimental feelings and empathize with any of the characters. Meanwhile, Mother Courage is not depicted as a noble character. The Brechtian epic theatre distinguished itself from the ancient Greek tragedies, in which the heroes are far above the average. Neither does Brecht's ending of his play inspire any desire to imitate the main character, Mother Courage.

Mother Courage is among Brecht's most famous plays. Some directors consider it to be the greatest play of the 20th century. Brecht expresses the dreadfulness of war and the idea that virtues are not rewarded in corrupt times. He used an epic structure to force the audience to focus on the issues rather than getting involved with the characters and their emotions. Epic plays are a distinct genre typical of Brecht. Some critics believe that he created the form.

As epic theatre

Mother Courage is an example of Brecht's concepts of epic theatre and Verfremdungseffekt, or "V" effect; preferably "alienation" or "estrangement effect" Verfremdungseffekt is achieved through the use of placards which reveal the events of each scene, juxtaposition, actors changing characters and costume on stage, the use of narration, simple props and scenery. For instance, a single tree would be used to convey a whole forest, and the stage is usually flooded with bright white light, whether it's a winter's night or a summer's day. Several songs, interspersed throughout the play, are used to underscore the themes of the play. They also require the audience to think about what the playwright is saying.

Roles

 Mother Courage (also known as "Canteen Anna")
 Kattrin (Catherine), her mute daughter
 Eilif, her older son
 Schweizerkas ("Swiss Cheese", also mentioned as Feyos), her younger son
 Recruiting Officer
 Sergeant
 Cook
 Swedish Commander
 Chaplain
 Ordinance Officer
 Yvette Pottier
 Man with the Bandage
 Another Sergeant
 Old Colonel
 Clerk
 Young Soldier
 Older Soldier
 Peasant
 Peasant Woman
 Young Man
 Old Woman
 Another Peasant
 Another Peasant Woman
 Young Peasant
 Lieutenant
 Voice

Performances

The play was originally produced at the Schauspielhaus Zürich, produced by Leopold Lindtberg in 1941. Most of the score consisted of original compositions by the Swiss composer Paul Burkhard; the rest had been arranged by him. The musicians were placed in view of the audience so that they could be seen, one of Brecht's many techniques in Epic Theatre. Therese Giehse, a well-known actress at the time, took the title role.

The second production of Mother Courage took place in then East Berlin in 1949, with Brecht's (second) wife Helene Weigel, his main actress and later also director, as Mother Courage. Paul Dessau supplied a new score, composed in close collaboration with Brecht himself. This production would highly influence the formation of Brecht's company, the Berliner Ensemble, which would provide him a venue to direct many of his plays. (Brecht died directing Galileo for the Ensemble.) Brecht revised the play for this production in reaction to the reviews of the Zürich production, which empathized with the "heart-rending vitality of all maternal creatures". Even so, he wrote that the Berlin audience failed to see Mother Courage's crimes and participation in the war and focused on her suffering instead.

The next production (and second production in Germany) was directed by Brecht at the Munich Kammerspiele in 1950, with the original Mother Courage, Therese Giehse, with a set designed by Theo Otto (see photo, above.)

In Spanish, it was premiered in 1954 in Buenos Aires with Alejandra Boero and in 1958 in Montevideo with China Zorrilla from the Uruguayan National Comedy Company. In this language, the main character has also been played by actresses Rosa María Sardá (Madrid, 1986), Cipe Lincovsky (Buenos Aires, 1989), Vicky Peña (Barcelona, 2003), Claudia Lapacó (Buenos Aires, 2018) and Blanca Portillo (Madrid, 2019).

In other languages, it was played by famous actresses as Simone Signoret, Lotte Lenya, Dorothea Neff (Vienna, 1963), Germaine Montero, Angela Winkler, Hanna Schygulla, Katina Paxinou (Athens, 1971), Maria Bill (Viena), María Casares (París, 1969), Eunice Muñoz (Lisbon, 1987), Pupella Maggio, Liv Ullmann (Oslo), Maddalena Crippa (Milán), etc.

In 1955, Joan Littlewood's Theatre Workshop gave the play its London première, with Littlewood performing the title role.

In June 1959 the BBC broadcast a television version adapted by Eric Crozier from Eric Bentley's English translation of the play. Produced by Rudolph Cartier; it starred Flora Robson in the title role.

The play remained unperformed in Britain after the 1955 Littlewood production until 1961 when the Stratford-upon-Avon Amateur Players undertook to introduce the play to the English Midlands. Directed by American Keith Fowler and presented on the floor of the Stratford Hippodrome, the play drew high acclaim. The title role was played by Elizabeth ("Libby") Cutts, with Pat Elliott as Katrin, Digby Day as Swiss Cheese, and James Orr as Eiliff.

The play received its American premiere at Cleveland Play House in 1958, starring Harriet Brazier as Mother Courage. The play was directed by Benno Frank and the set was designed by Paul Rodgers.

The first Broadway production of Mother Courage opened at the Martin Beck Theatre on 28 March 1963. It was directed by Jerome Robbins, starred Anne Bancroft, and featured Barbara Harris and Gene Wilder. It ran for 52 performances and was nominated for four Tony Awards. During this production Wilder first met Bancroft's then-boyfriend, Mel Brooks.

In 1971 Joachim Tenschert directed a staging of Brecht's original Berliner Ensemble production for the Melbourne Theatre Company at the Princess Theatre. Gloria Dawn played Mother Courage; Wendy Hughes, John Wood and Tony Llewellyn-Jones her children; Frank Thring the Chaplain; Frederick Parslow the cook; Jennifer Hagan played Yvette; and Peter Curtin.

In 1980 Wilford Leach directed a new adaptation by Ntozake Shange at The Public Theater. This version was set in the American South during Reconstruction. Gloria Foster played Mother Courage in a cast that also included Morgan Freeman, Samuel L. Jackson, Hattie Winston, Raynor Scheine, and Anna Deavere Smith.

In May 1982 at London's Theatre Space Internationalist Theatre staged a multi-ethnic production of Mother Courage "whose attack on the practice of war could not— with South Atlantic news (Falklands War) filling the front pages— have been more topical.." "The cast ... is made of experienced actors from all over the world and perhaps their very cosmopolitanism helps to bring new textures to a familiar dish".  Margaret Robertson played Mother Courage, Milos Kirek the Cook, Renu Setna the Chaplain, Joseph Long the Officer, Angelique Rockas Yvette, and Josephine Welcome Kattrin.

In 1995–96, Diana Rigg was awarded an Evening Standard Theatre Award for her performance in the title role, directed by Jonathan Kent, at the National Theatre. David Hare provided the translation.

From August to September 2006, Mother Courage and Her Children was produced by The Public Theater in New York City with a new translation by playwright Tony Kushner. This production included new music by composer Jeanine Tesori and was directed by George C. Wolfe. Meryl Streep played Mother Courage with a supporting cast that included Kevin Kline and Austin Pendleton. This production was free to the public and played to full houses at the Public Theater's Delacorte Theater in Central Park. It ran for four weeks.

This same Tony Kushner translation was performed in a new production at London's Royal National Theatre between September and December 2009, with Fiona Shaw in the title role, directed by Deborah Warner and with new songs performed live by Duke Special.

In 2013, Wesley Enoch directed a new translation by Paula Nazarski for an all-indigenous Australian cast at the Queensland Performing Arts Centre's Playhouse Theatre.

In Sri Lanka, Mother Courage has been translated into Sinhalese and produced several times. In 1972, Henry Jayasena directed it as Diriya Mawa Ha Ege Daruwo and under the same name Anoja Weerasinghe directed it in 2006. In 2014, Ranjith Wijenayake translated into Sinhalese the translation of John Willet as Dhairya Maatha and produced it as a stage drama.

Brecht's reaction
After the 1941 performances in Switzerland, Brecht believed critics had misunderstood the play. While many sympathized with Courage, Brecht's goal was to show that Mother Courage was wrong for not understanding the circumstances she and her children were in. According to Hans Mayer, Brecht changed the play for the 1949 performances in East Berlin to make Courage less sympathetic to the audience. However, according to Mayer, these alterations did not significantly change the audience's sympathy for Courage. Katie Baker, in a retrospective article about Mother Courage on its 75th anniversary, notes that "[Brecht's audiences] were missing the point of his Verfremdungseffekt, that breaking of the fourth wall which was supposed to make the masses think, not feel, in order to nudge them in a revolutionary direction." She also quotes Brecht as lamenting: "The (East Berliner) audiences of 1949 did not see Mother Courage's crimes, her participation, her desire to share in the profits of the war business; they saw only her failure, her sufferings."

Popular culture
The German feminist newspaper Courage, published from 1976 to 1984, was named after Mother Courage, whom the editors saw as a "self-directed woman ... not a starry-eyed idealist but neither is she satisfied with the status quo".

The character of Penelope Pennywise in the Tony Award-winning musical Urinetown has been called "a cartoonish descendant of Brecht's Mother Courage".

Mother Courage has been compared to the popular musical, Fiddler on the Roof. As Matthew Gurewitsch wrote in The New York Sun, "Deep down, Mother Courage has a lot in common with Tevye the Milkman in Fiddler on the Roof. Like him, she's a mother hen helpless to protect the brood."

Mother Courage was the inspiration for Lynn Nottage's Pulitzer winning play Ruined, written after Nottage spent time with Congolese women in Ugandan refugee camps.

English versions

 1941 – Hoffman Reynolds Hays (1904–1980), translation for New Directions Publishing
 1955 – Eric Bentley, translation for Doubleday/Garden City
 1965 – Eric Bentley, translation, and W. H. Auden, songs translation, for the National Theatre, London
 1972 – Ralph Manheim, translation for Random House/Pantheon Books
 1980 – John Willett, translation for Methuen Publishing
 1980 – Ntozake Shange, adaptation for New York Shakespeare Festival New York
 1984 – Hanif Kureishi, adaptation, and Sue Davies, songs translation, for the Barbican Centre, London (Samuel French Ltd.)
 1995 – David Hare, adaptation for the Royal National Theatre, London (A & C Black, 1996)
 2000 – Lee Hall, adaptation, and Jan-Willem van den Bosch, translation, for Yvonne Arnaud Theatre, England (Methuen Drama, 2003)
 2006 – Michael Hofmann, adaptation, and John Willett, songs translation, for the English Touring Theatre (A & C Black, 2006)
 2006 – Tony Kushner, adaptation for The Public Theater, New York City, published in the form used in the 2009 Royal National Theatre production
 2014 – David Hare, adaptation presented by the Arena Stage, Washington DC with Kathleen Turner as Mother Courage and featuring 13 new songs.
 2014 – Wesley Enoch, adaptation, Queensland Theatre Company
 2014 – David Edgar, translation for Stratford Festival, directed by Martha Henry
 2015 – Ed Thomas for National Theatre Wales, site specific production with an all-female cast held at the Merthyr Tydfil Labour Club
 2015 – Eamon Flack, adaptation, Belvoir St Theatre, Sydney.
 2017 – Danielle Tarento direction of the Tony Kushner adaptation, Southwark Playhouse, London.
 2019 – Adaptation by Anna Jordan for the Royal Exchange theatre, Manchester UK. Starring Julie Hesmondhalgh as Mother Courage.

See also
 List of plays with anti-war themes

References

Sources consulted (English versions list)
 University of Wisconsin Digital Collections, Brecht's Works in English: A Bibliography, online database.
 Doollee – The Playwrights Database of Modern Plays: "Adaptations/Translations of Plays by Bertolt Brecht"
 Squiers, Anthony (2014). An Introduction to the Social and Political Philosophy of Bertolt Brecht: Revolution and Aesthetics. Amsterdam: Rodopi. 9789042038998.
 The International Brecht Society: "Brecht in English Translation"
 The Bertolt Brecht Forum: "Bertolt Brecht in English", tabular list

External links

 

Plays by Bertolt Brecht
Compositions by Paul Dessau
1939 plays
Anti-war plays
Thirty Years' War in popular culture
German plays adapted into films